Brachyta is a genus of the Lepturinae subfamily in long-horned beetle family?

Species
Species within this genus include:

 Brachyta amurensis (Kraatz, 1879)
 Brachyta balcanica (Hampe, 1871)
 Brachyta bifasciata (Olivier, 1792)
 Brachyta borni (Ganglbauer, 1903)
 Brachyta breiti (Tippmann, 1946)
 Brachyta caucasica Rost, 1892
 Brachyta danilevskyii Tshernyshev & Dubatolov, 2005
 Brachyta delagrangei Pic, 1891
 Brachyta dongbeiensis (Wang, 2003)
 Brachyta interrogationis (Linnaeus, 1758)
 Brachyta punctata (Faldermann, 1833)
 Brachyta rosti Pic, 1900
 Brachyta sachalinensis Matsumura, 1911
 Brachyta striolata (Gebler, 1817)
 Brachyta variabilis (Gebler, 1817)

References 
, 1912, Coleoptm Cat., 39: 185(part.).
, 1864, Gen. Col. Eur., 4: 185.
The Coleoptera of Japan in Color, vol. IV, Hoikusha (Osaka). .
The Japanese Society of Coleopterology (eds.), 1984. The Longicorn-Beetles of Japan in Color, Kodansha(Tokyo). .
An Illustrated Guide to Identification of Longicorn Beetle of Japan, Tokai University Press (Tokyo). .
the Zoological Institute of the Russian Academy of Sciences,  Subfamily Lepturinae: tribe Rhagiini (atlas of long-horned beetles of Russia)

Lepturinae